The Burgberg is a hill in Hesse, Germany. It is situated in the municipality of Schauenburg.

Hills of Hesse